Rd is an abbreviation for road.

RD or Rd may also refer to:

Arts, entertainment, and media
 Real Drive, an anime by Production I.G
 RD (group), a British girl group also known as Ruff Diamondz
 Rilindja Demokratike, an Albanian newspaper
 Reader's Digest, a United States general-interest magazine

Businesses and organizations
 USDA Rural Development, an agency of the United States Department of Agriculture
 Ryan International Airlines (IATA airline designator RD)

Military decorations
 Reserve Decoration, an award for service in the Royal Navy Reserve of the United Kingdom
 Emblem for Reserve Force Service or Reserve Decoration, an award of the South African National Defense Force Military Reserve

Science, technology, and mathematics

Computing and mathematics
 Rata Die, a calendar-independent system to assign numbers to calendar dates
 Remote Desktop, a graphical interface to connect one computer to another over a network
 Rider (software), a cross-platform IDE intended for C# and .NET development
 Route distinguisher, in data networking, a concept in Multiprotocol Label Switching
 Ruby Document format, a markup language used for documentation of Ruby programs

Health and medicine
 Restrictive dermopathy
 Reading disability, a condition resulting primarily from neurological factors
 Registered Dietitian, an expert in dietetics
 Retinal detachment, a disorder of the eye
 Risk difference, a term in epidemiology related to absolute risk reduction

Other uses in science and technology
 Rate–distortion optimization, a decision algorithm used in video compression
 Reaktivniy Dvigatel, a Soviet Russian prefix for an engine design series (literally, "reactive engine"; see RD-8 for example)
 Research and development
 Pratt & Whitney Rocketdyne, a United States rocket engine company
 Rutherford (unit), a unit of radioactivity

Other uses
 Rd, the mathematical domain of real numbers
 ‹rd›, a Latin alphabet digraph of a retroflex stop in Aboriginal Australian languages
 Repair Depot (e.g., 6 Repair Depot), in military use
 Red Line (Washington Metro)
 Resident director, a common staff position at universities and colleges with on-campus housing
 Richmond and Danville Railroad
 rmdir, a shell command meaning "remove directory"
 Rural Dean, an ecclesiastical title in Anglicanism
 Rural delivery service, mail delivery in what are traditionally considered rural areas in the United States
 Dominican peso (currency symbol: RD$)
 An English-language ordinal indicator, for ordinal numbers ending in "third" (e.g. 3rd, 23rd, 33rd)
 A round or cartridge of ammunition
An abbreviation of Regional district